Désiré-Michel Vesque (born 1817 in Honfleur) was a French clergyman and bishop for the Roman Catholic Diocese of Roseau. He was ordained in 1840. He was appointed bishop in 1856. He died in 1858.

References 

1817 births
1858 deaths
French Roman Catholic bishops
People from Honfleur
Roman Catholic bishops of Roseau